Kongiganak Airport  is a state-owned public-use airport located adjacent to the village of Kongiganak, in the Bethel Census Area of the U.S. state of Alaska.

Although most U.S. airports use the same three-letter location identifier for the FAA and IATA, this airport is assigned DUY by the FAA and KKH by the IATA. The airport's ICAO identifier is PADY.

Facilities and aircraft 
Kongiganak Airport has one runway designated 18/36 with a gravel surface measuring 1,885 by 35 feet (575 x 11 m). For the 12-month period ending August 26, 2005, the airport had 1,200 general aviation aircraft operations, an average of 100 per month.

Airlines and destinations 

Prior to its bankruptcy and cessation of all operations, Ravn Alaska served the airport from multiple locations.

References

External links 
 Alaska FAA airport diagram (GIF)
 Resources for this airport:
 
 
 

Airports in the Bethel Census Area, Alaska